Embodiment of Evil is a 2008 Brazilian horror film directed by and starring José Mojica Marins. It is the third installment in his Coffin Joe trilogy, featuring Marins reprising his role as Zé do Caixão (in English, Coffin Joe). The film is preceded by At Midnight I'll Take Your Soul (1964) and This Night I'll Possess Your Corpse (1967).

A flashback scene in the film reveals that the young Coffin Joe (portrayed in the scene by Raymond Castile) survived after submerging in a swamp at the end of the previous film. After serving 40 years in a prison mental ward, Coffin Joe (José Mojica Marins) is released to the streets of modern-day São Paulo. Immediately after his release, Coffin Joe renews his lifelong obsession to sire a male child with a woman whom he perceives to be of exceptional qualities capable of continuing his bloodline, which he feels to be "superior" above all others.

Plot 
After being released from the prison mental ward, Coffin Joe is greeted at the gate by his old and loyal servant Bruno (Rui Rezende), who takes him to a secluded basement below a favela in São Paulo. As well as Bruno, the hideout is populated by four fanatics who are obsessed with Coffin Joe's history and ideas, and have been waiting and preparing for his arrival in order that they may faithfully serve him. After questioning their motives and testing their loyalty, Coffin Joe immediately orders the followers to begin kidnapping women so he can renew his murderous quest for "the continuation of the blood", his lifelong obsession to find who he determines to be a perfect woman who will bear him a son. His first victim is Dr. Hilda (Cléo De Páris), a controversial eugenicist who Bruno kidnaps. Coffin Joe tests her will by injecting her with drugs and she has hallucinations of Coffin Joe cutting off her buttock and presenting it to her after which she willingly eats it. Meanwhile, Coronel Claudiomiro Pontes (Jece Valadão), a fervently Roman Catholic police captain who holds an old grudge against Coffin Joe for blinding his eye, and Father Eugênio (Milhem Cortaz), a mentally unstable priest (the son of one of Coffin Joe's past victims, Dr. Rudolfo in At Midnight I'll Take Your Soul) learn about Coffin Joe's release, and decide to join forces to seek Coffin Joe and kill him once and for all.

On his first night, Coffin Joe starts to be haunted by ghostly visions of his previous victims, including Terezinha and Lenita from At Midnight I'll Take Your Soul, and Laura from This Night I'll Possess Your Corpse. However, he convinces himself that they are just his imagination although they continue to haunt him throughout the film. He later singles out a young gypsy woman named  Elena (Nara Sakarê), who has also been intrigued with him since his appearance at the favela. Elena's aunts, Cabíria (Helena Ignez) and Lucrécia (Débora Muniz), knowing of his evil history, perform a ritual to protect Elena from Coffin Joe and place a curse on him. After Joe kills the two aunts, Elena offers herself to him, although while having sex with her he has a vision where he finds himself in another dimension which is a bloody, intestine-like maze. There he is met by a figure called the Mystifier (José Celso Martinez Corrêa), who takes him to an arid, surreal landscape called Purgatory. The Mystifier shows Coffin Joe horrific visions of human depravity, suffering, and perversion, as well as a female figure of Coffin Joe's death. Greatly disturbed, Joe sends his followers to quickly kidnap several more women and proceeds to torture them through sadistic ordeals to test their endurance and willingness to succumb to his perceived superiority.

When the police find Coffin Joe's hideout that night they find it deserted, except for the gruesome remains of his victims. Joe escapes through the dark woods with Colonel Pontes and Father Eugênio after him. Joe arrives at the closed amusement park, Playcenter, where Joe kills the policemen, but is wounded by Father Eugênio, who impales Coffin Joe through the heart with a large crucifix. Although relieved thinking he has killed Coffin Joe, Father Eugênio is immediately pursued by shadows and the voice of Coffin Joe as he leaves the amusement park. As Father Eugênio leaves, Elena appears. She pulls the crucifix out of Coffin Joe, removes her clothes and has sexual intercourse with him. The final scene takes place at Coffin Joe's funeral, where it is revealed that Coffin Joe achieved his goal in the end, as the women who survived his ordeals, including Hilda and Elena, gathered at his funeral, are all pregnant.

Cast

Reception
During the Paulinia Film Festival, held July 5–12, 2008 in Paulinia, Sao Paulo, Brazil, Embodiment of Evil won 7 of 15 categories for fictional films. Marins was presented the Critics Choice award for best film. Other awards were best photography (José Roberto Eliezer), best film editing (Paulo Sacramento), best sound editing (Ricardo Reis), best soundtrack
(André Abujamra and Márcio Nigro), best art direction (Cássio Amarante).

References

External links 
Official film site 

 
 Official José Mojica Marins site 
Production diary by Raymond Castile

2008 films
2008 horror films
Brazilian horror films
Brazilian sequel films
Color sequels of black-and-white films
Films directed by José Mojica Marins
Films set in São Paulo
Films shot in São Paulo
2000s Portuguese-language films
2000s supernatural horror films